The Socket FP3 or μBGA906 is a CPU socket for laptops that was released in June 2014 by AMD with its mobility APU products codenamed Kaveri.

"Kaveri"-branded  products combine Steamroller with Crystal Series (GCN), UVD 4.2 and VCE 2 video acceleration, AMD TrueAudio audio acceleration and AMD Eyefinity-based multi-monitor support of up to two non-DisplayPort- or up to four DisplayPort monitors.

 ECC DIMMs are supported on Socket FP3, mixing of ECC and non-ECC DIMMs within a system is not supported.
 There are 3 PCI Express cores: one 2 x16 core and two 5 x8 cores, for a total of 64 lanes. There are 8 configurable ports, which can be divided into 2 groups:
 Gfx-group: contains 2 x8 ports. Each port can be limited to lower link widths for applications that require fewer lanes. Additionally, the two ports can be combined to create a single x16 link.
 GPP-group: contains 1 x4 UMI and 5 General Purpose Ports (GPP).
All PCIe links are capable of supporting PCIe 2.x data rates. In addition, the Gfx link is capable of supporting PCIe 3.x data rate. The FP3 package supports two different voltage levels on the VDDP rail. At the 1.05 V nominal setting, the Gfx link can support PCI Express 3.x data rate, while at the 0.95 V setting, the maximum data rate supported by the Gfx link is PCI Express 2.x
 The FP3 package supports two different voltage levels on the VDDR rail. At the 1.05 V nominal setting, the maximum speed of DDR3-2133 can be supported while at the 0.95 V setting, the maximum speed supported is DDR3-1600.

Its desktop counterpart is Socket FM2+.

Feature overview

See also
 List of AMD processors with 3D graphics
 List of AMD mobile microprocessors

External links

 http://support.amd.com/TechDocs/49125_15h_Models_30h-3Fh_BKDG.pdf#search=Socket%20FP3

AMD mobile sockets